Carlo Muraro (born 1 June 1955 in Gazzo) is a retired Italian professional footballer who played as a left winger.

Style of play
A versatile forward, with an eye for goal, Muraro was capable of playing both as a centre-forward and as a left winger. His main characteristics were his exceptional pace, as well as his work-rate, dribbling skills, agility, and ability to time his runs, which made him a dangerous attacking threat on counter-attacks. He was also a powerful and accurate striker of the ball with either foot, and was known for his precise crossing, and ability in the air, courtesy of his elevation, timing, and heading accuracy. Beyond his skills as a player, he was also known for his intelligence both when attacking and defending, his ability to read the game, and his tendency to be decisive away from home. Due to his playing style and role on the pitch with Inter, he was given the nickname "The White Jair."

Honours
Inter
 Serie A: 1979–80
 Coppa Italia: 1977–78

External links
 Inter Profile

References

1955 births
Living people
Italian footballers
Serie A players
Serie B players
Inter Milan players
S.S.D. Varese Calcio players
Udinese Calcio players
Ascoli Calcio 1898 F.C. players
S.S. Arezzo players
U.S. Pistoiese 1921 players
Calcio Lecco 1912 managers
Association football midfielders
Italian football managers